This is a list of schools in Perak, Malaysia. It is categorised according to the variants of schools in Malaysia, and is arranged by region.

Primary schools

National primary schools

Missionary national primary schools

National-type Chinese primary schools

National-type Tamil primary schools

Religious primary schools (SABK)

Special education primary schools

Secondary schools

National secondary schools

Missionary national secondary schools

National-type Chinese secondary schools

Fully residential school

MARA junior science colleges

Sixth form college (Kolej Tingkatan 6)

Vocational secondary schools

Religious secondary schools

Islamic national secondary schools (SMKA)

Islamic government-aided secondary schools (SABK)

Private schools

References 

Perak